Sabeel Ahmed is a suspect arrested after the 2007 Glasgow Airport attack. He was married to Sarah Fatima, his distant relative, on 21 July 2010 . He studied at the Dr B R Ambedkar Medical College, an affiliated college of the Rajiv Gandhi University of Health Sciences between 1998 and 2003 and completed his internship in 2003–2004, moving to the UK in November 2004 to pursue higher studies.

He is the brother of Kafeel Ahmed, who was also arrested in the aftermath of the attack, and has been variously reported as the second cousin, uncle or brother of Mohammed Haneef, with whom he studied medicine in Bangalore, and who was arrested at the Brisbane Airport on 2 July 2007. Mohamed Haneef is a second cousin of Sabeel as their grandparents are brother and sister.

Ahmed was alleged to have been given Haneef's British mobile phone SIM card when the latter left the UK for a job at the Gold Coast Hospital in Queensland, Australia.; He is reported to have applied for medical positions in Western Australia in 2005, but was rejected after officials because of concerns over their qualifications and references.

On 14 July 2007, British police charged Ahmed with failing to disclose information that could have prevented an act of terrorism. In April 2008 he was given an 18-month prison sentence for withholding information.

Ahmed was deported back to India on 8 May 2008 after being released due to time already served. He moved to Saudi Arabia in 2010 to work at a hospital. In 2015, he was charged by the National Investigation Agency in a case of an alleged militant recruitment by Lashkar-e-Taiba carried out in 2012. In 2017, the Delhi Police accused him of trying to recruit Indians for Al Qaeda in the Indian Subcontinent. He was deported back to India and arrested by the NIA on 28 August 2020.

See also
 2007 UK terrorist incidents

References

June 2007 UK terrorist incidents
Living people
Place of birth missing (living people)
Year of birth missing (living people)